The Czech national cricket team, nicknamed the Lions, is the team that represents the Czech Republic in international cricket. The team is organised by the Czech Cricket Union which became an affiliate member of the International Cricket Council (ICC) in 2000 and an associate member in 2017. The national side did not debut until 2006, when it played a series against Austria. It made its international tournament debut in 2008, at a Twenty20 tournament in Wales, and has since participated regularly in international events, including some organised by the European Cricket Council.

History

2008–2017

In June 2008, an unofficial national team from the Czech Republic came second in an ICC supported Euro Twenty 20 tournament which took place at the Carmel & District Cricket Club in Wales. They were beaten by Estonia with 3 balls remaining in the final over after beating Russia and a Cricket Board of Wales team in the group stage, and a team representing Poland in the semi-final.

In August 2008, the Czech Republic hosted the Prague International Twenty 20 cricket cup at their former Vypich ground. Teams from Russia, Hungary, Romania and Bulgaria joined a team representing the Czech Republic in this 2-day Twenty 20 event. Unfortunately, the team from Belarus was unable to attend due to visa complications and their place was filled by a Czech B team.

2009: First official tournament

In September 2009, the Czech Republic participated for the first time in the ICC European Division 5 Championship in Corfu, finishing a respectable third (defeating Bulgaria, Turkey and Estonia) behind Sweden and the tournament winners, Greece.

In May 2011, the team took part in the ICC Europe Division 3 Championship in the newly structured format. They lost narrowly to Bulgaria but three wickets apiece from Brigham Smith and Scott Page restricted Estonia to 100 all out, which the Czech team chased down thanks to an unbeaten 33 from wicket-keeper Mik Starý. Turkey and tournament winners Sweden beat the Czech team in the next two matches, but a 23-run victory over tournament hosts Slovenia in the last match helped the Czech team to finish fourth overall.

The highlight of 2012 was a trip to Budapest, Hungary, to face their central European rivals on Hungary's impressive cricket ground. The Czech team were comprehensively beaten in the Saturday 40-over friendly, but they came back well to win the 20-over friendly on Sunday by four runs, with young bowler Damian Kyselý taking three wickets in an impressive display. Captain Scott Page stepped up and bowled an ideal final over to seal the win. In 2013, a plan to host Hungary at the Vinoř Cricket Ground in Vinoř, Prague, was abandoned due to bad weather. The team played one T20 in Vienna, losing by 87 runs to Austria.

2014 saw an increase in fixtures, with trips to Vienna and Dresden as well as hosting the Central Europe Cup, with T20 matches against Poland, Switzerland and Luxembourg. The match in Austria finished in another crushing defeat, this time to Austria's U25s. The trip to Dresden saw the team pick up a two-wicket win in a 50-over friendly against Dresden's 1st XI. Young bowler Oliver Matoušek picked up five wickets in his representative debut for the Lions, and Suditha Udugalage and Rahul Subash batted well to see the team home. 

The Central Europe Cup ended with the team finishing bottom of the table, but the Czech team were the only team to beat champions Poland, and the Czech Republic also gave Switzerland a good run for their money before rain affected play, with Switzerland capitalising to take victory. A lacklustre Czech team then lost to a resurgent Luxembourg team on Sunday morning.

The Czech team were awarded the tournament's Spirit of Cricket award for wanting to play out the full match against Switzerland, despite being ahead on the Duckworth–Lewis method at the time. Opening batsmen Sudhir Gladson and Hilal Ahmad received man of the match awards for their performances against Poland and Switzerland, respectively.

2016- Played Central Europe Cup in Prague and traveled to Poland to play one-day tri-series with Poland, Hungary national teams.
"Czech National Team Winner OD tri-series cup 2016".

2017- In 2017 a number of reforms regarding Associate Members and pathways to ICC tournaments were announced and due to the progress we have made in our domestic leagues the Czech Republic will return to ICC tournament cricket in August 2018 at the ICC. World T20 Europe Qualifiers in The Netherlands. 
Czech National Team played CE cup in Czech Republic, Euro T20 cup in Warsaw Poland.

2018-Present
In April 2018, the ICC decided to grant full Twenty20 International (T20I) status to all its members. Therefore, all Twenty20 matches played between Czech Republic and other ICC members after 1 January 2019 will be a full T20I.

Czech Republic played their first T20I match against Austria on 30 August 2019 during the 2019 Continental Cup in Romania.

Current squad
This lists all the players who were named in the most recent squad. Updated as of 31 July 2022.

Records
International Match Summary — Czech Republic
 
Last updated 31 July 2022.

Twenty20 International 

 Highest team total: 278/4 v. Turkey on 30 August 2019 at Moara Vlasiei Cricket Ground, Moara Vlăsiei.
 Highest individual score: 115*, Sabawoon Davizi v. Bulgaria on 12 May 2022 at Marsa Sports Club, Marsa.
 Best individual bowling figures: 5/15, Sudesh Wickramasekara v. Bulgaria on 31 July 2022 at Tikkurila Cricket Ground, Vantaa.

Most T20I runs for Czech Republic

Most T20I wickets for Czech Republic

T20I record versus other nations

Records complete to T20I #1711. Last updated 31 July 2022.

See also
List of Czech Republic Twenty20 International cricketers

References

External links
 Czech Cricket official website
 Play-cricket.com stats database for Czech National Team games, official and unofficial

National cricket teams
Cricket